Second City Firsts is a British drama anthology series of single plays, broadcast by the BBC, all lasting thirty minutes. Recorded at BBC Pebble Mill in Birmingham, or sometimes filmed on location, the series was broadcast between 1973 and 1978.

The series title referred both to Pebble Mill's location in England's Second City, and the fact that the series commissioned an unprecedented amount of first-time writers.

The 1974 episode Girl, about a homosexual relationship between two members in the Women's Royal Army Corps, featured the first lesbian (and same-sex) kiss on British television, between Alison Steadman (as Jackie) and Myra Frances (as Harvey). The recording of the episode was discovered in the Thames Television archives decades later, and digitized by the BBC. In 2016, it was added to the BBC Store's "Prejudice and Pride Collection" and made available for streaming.

The 1975 episode Club Havana featured actress Julie Walters in her first role on British TV.

The 1976 episode Jack Flea's Birthday Celebration was written by Ian McEwan, his screen debut.

Series 
 15 October 1973 to 19 November 1973
 15 February 1974 to 25 March 1974
 28 October 1974 to 16 December 1974
 20 March 1975 to 24 April 1975
 25 October 1975 to 29 November 1975
 13 January 1976 to 24 April 1976
 14 November 1976 to 12 December 1976
 5 March 1977 to 6 June 1977
 8 April 1978 to 13 May 1978

Archive holdings
Of the 53 plays in the series, 28 survive.

See also
Other BBC2 drama anthology series include
 Theatre 625
 BBC2 Playhouse
 Thirty-Minute Theatre

References

External links

1970s British anthology television series
1973 British television series debuts
1978 British television series endings
1970s British drama television series
Lost BBC episodes
BBC television dramas
BBC Birmingham productions
English-language television shows